Daruiyeh (also Romanized as Dārū’īyeh and Daroo’iyeh; also known as Darū’ī, Darū’ī Pā’īn, and Darū’ī-ye Pā’īn) is a village in Esmaili Rural District, Esmaili District, Anbarabad County, Kerman Province, Iran. At the 2006 census, its population was 937, in 191 families.

References 

Populated places in Anbarabad County